The Bait Ul Aafiyat mosque, more commonly known as the Philly Mosque, or the North Philly Mosque, is a large mosque in Philadelphia.

History
The construction of the mosque began with fundraising efforts since 2003. Later a vacant land where the mosque currently stands today was purchased in 2007. The land used to be a tire dumping ground. Construction work of the mosque began in 2013. The mosque was officially opened on October 19, 2018 after it was constructed with a cost of US$7 million.

Architecture
The mosque was constructed with traditional Islamic architectural style and consists of a 55-foot high minaret. It was designed by Rich Olaya of Olaya Studio. The building consists of 3 floors and it covers an area of 21,400 square feet. The basement consists of commercial kitchen, the middle floor consists of accommodation rooms and the top floor consists of library and offices. The prayer hall of the mosque spans over an area of 5,000 square feet, which are divided into two for male and female, with a combined number that it can accommodate of 700 worshipers.

See also
 Islam in the United States
 Religion in Philadelphia

References

External links
 

2018 establishments in the United States
Mosques in Philadelphia
Mosques completed in 2018